Stemonoporus acuminatus is a species of plant in the family Dipterocarpaceae. It is endemic to Sri Lanka.

Trunk
Often distorted.

Flowers
Inflorescence - axillary.

References

Flora of Sri Lanka
acuminatus
Endangered plants
Taxonomy articles created by Polbot